The Sardegna Rally Race (formerly known as Rally di Sardegna), is a motorcycle rally-raid which is disputed each year in Sardinia, Italy from 1984. and with the new name from 2008, so as not to be confused with the rally Rally di Sardegna.

Editions

References

External links
 Official site

Rally raid races
Cross Country Rally World Cup races
Motorsport competitions in Italy
Sport in Sardinia